The FC Granada a Sierra Nevada was a Spanish  gauge narrow gauge railway that operated over  of track. The original  section was opened between Granada and Maitena in 1925, with an extension to San Juan in 1956 and later to La Estella. The line closed in 1974.

The railway was an electric railway and operated on a 1200 V DC system. In 1958 it had 4 electric locomotives, 6 passenger trailers and 14 freight cars.

See also 
 Narrow gauge railways in Spain

References 

Electric railways in Spain
750 mm gauge railways in Spain